Fominskaya is a rural locality (a village) in Konoshsky District, Arkhangelsk Oblast, Russia. The population was 25 as of 2010. There is 1 street.

Geography 
Fominskaya is located on the Vokhtomitsa River, 42 km north of Konosha (the district's administrative centre) by road. Kuznetsovskaya is the nearest rural locality.

References 

Rural localities in Konoshsky District